Phaeoblemma is a genus of moths of the family Erebidae. The genus was erected by George Hampson in 1926.

Species
Phaeoblemma amabilis (Möschler, 1880) Peru, Suriname
Phaeoblemma contracta (Walker, 1865) Brazil, Costa Rica
Phaeoblemma dares (Stoll, [1782]) Suriname
Phaeoblemma pascoana Barbut & Lalanne-Cassou, 2006 Peru
Phaeoblemma undina (Felder & Rogenhofer, 1874) French Guiana

References

Calpinae